The following is a list of National Wrestling Alliance attendance records. Founded in 1948, the National Wrestling Alliance controlled the professional wrestling industry in North America and other parts of the world during the "Territory-era" (1940s-1980s). All of the major NWA promoters were put out of business after the World Wrestling Federation began its national expansion under Vince McMahon, Jr. during the 1980s wrestling boom.

The two largest remaining members, New Japan Pro Wrestling (NJPW) and World Championship Wrestling (WCW) left the organization in 1993, however, the NWA continued to exist as a loose coalition of independent promotions until the mid-2010s. In 2017, the NWA was purchased by Billy Corgan and became a singular, independent promotion, putting an end to the NWA territory system.

The list is dominated by the American wrestling promotion World Wide Wrestling Federation (WWWF), a precursor to the modern-day World Wrestling Entertainment, which was operated by Vince McMahon, Sr. and Toots Mondt. Based in New York City, New York, they joined the NWA in 1957 as the Capitol Wrestling Corporation (CWC) with their territory eventually encompassing most of the Northeastern United States. Pat O'Connor vs. Buddy Rogers, co-promoted by the CWC and Fred Kohler Enterprises, was held at Comiskey Park on June 30, 1961, drawing a crowd of 38,000. It earned a then-record $141,345 at the gate and is most attended NWA live event of all-time. On January 24, 1963, McMahon and Mondt left the NWA and began promoting their own world champion under the WWWF banner. McMahon rejoined the NWA in 1971 and remained a member until his son, Vince McMahon, Jr., finally split from the organization in 1983. 

The Japan Pro Wrestling Alliance (JWA) and World Wrestling Council (WWC) are tied for the second highest number of shows with 5 each. At the height of its power, NWA-affiliated promotions held events at indoor arenas and sports stadiums that typically had a seating capacity of at least 20,000 people or more, and in which the NWA World Heavyweight Championship was often contested in the main event. All but sixteen of the events have been held in United States, while five have been held in Japan and Puerto Rico, four in Mexico and two in Canada.

Events and attendances

Historical

Territory-era (1940s-1980s)

Modern-era (1990s-2010s)
Note: New Japan Pro Wrestling withdrew from the organization in February 1993, followed by World Championship Wrestling in September 1993.

Note: Total Nonstop Action Wrestling withdrew from the organization in May 2007.

See also
List of professional wrestling attendance records
List of professional wrestling attendance records in Canada
List of professional wrestling attendance records in Europe
List of professional wrestling attendance records in Japan
List of professional wrestling attendance records in Mexico
List of professional wrestling attendance records in Puerto Rico
List of professional wrestling attendance records in the United Kingdom
List of professional wrestling attendance records in the United States
List of WWE attendance records

Notes
 †  Retractable roof stadium
 *  Open air venue

References
General

Specific

External links
Cards With Highest Claimed Attendance from The Internet Wrestling Database
Supercards & Tournaments at ProWrestlingHistory.com
Pioneer & Territorry-era attendance records at Wrestlingdata.com

National Wrestling Alliance
Professional wrestling attendances
Attendance records